The 1926–27 Toronto St. Patricks season was the tenth season and the last under the St. Patricks banner for the Toronto National Hockey League (NHL) franchise. In February 1927, Conn Smythe and investors purchased the St. Patricks and changed the name to the Toronto Maple Leafs. On the ice, the team finished in fifth place, out of the playoffs.

Offseason

Regular season
After being turned down by the St. Patricks as coach to start the season, Conn Smythe used the success of the New York Rangers team he had assembled, to get an invitation to take over the team. At first, Smythe turned down the offer, saying that he wanted to be an owner or part-owner of the club instead. The St. Pats were for sale, and partner J. P. Bickell offered Smythe a chance to become part-owner. The club had reached a tentative deal to sell the club for $200,000, making Bickell's share $40,000. Bickell offered to hold onto his share, if Smythe could raise $160,000 to pay of the other share-holders and take over the team. On February 14, 1927, Smythe and partners paid $85,000 with the final $75,000 to pay off the club due within 30 days. Smythe renamed the team the Maple Leafs, a name and insignia he felt would be popular, more popular than St. Patricks.

The club played its final game as the St. Patricks against Detroit in Windsor, Ontario on February 15, 1927, and their first as the Maple Leafs at Arena Gardens on February 17, 1927. The Leafs wore new white uniforms with a green maple leaf and Toronto written on the sweater. The Leafs won their first game 4–1, under new coach Alex Romeril. Smythe took over as governor, but did not assume the management and coaching of the Leafs until 1927–28. He had commitments to coach the University of Toronto team and the Varsity Grads, a team of former U of T students who had played for the U of T team. He would coach the Grads to the Allan Cup title.

Final standings

Record vs. opponents

Schedule and results

Player statistics

Regular season
Scoring

Goaltending

Playoffs

The St. Pats did not qualify for the playoffs.

Transactions

September 7, 1926: Signed Free Agent Butch Keeling
September 27, 1926: Acquired Corbett Denneny, Leo Bourgeault and Laurie Scott from the Saskatoon Shieks (PrHL) for cash
October 13, 1926: Signed Free Agents Bill Brydge and Danny Cox
October 15, 1926: Lost Free Agent Reg Reid to the Stratford Nationals of the CPHL
October 16, 1926: Lost Mike Neville off Waivers to the Hamilton Tigers of the CPHL
October 18, 1926: Lost Francis Cain off Waivers to the Hamilton Tigers of the CPHL
October 18, 1926: Lost Norm Shay off Waivers to the New Haven Eagles of the Can-Am League
October 18, 1926: Traded Babe Dye to the Chicago Black Hawks for $15,000
October 28, 1926: Signed Free Agent Albert Pudas
November 1, 1926: Lost Free Agent Chris Speyer to the Niagara Falls Cataracts of the CPHL
November 3, 1926: Signed Free Agent Ace Bailey
November 10, 1926: Traded Albert Pudas to the Windsor Hornets of the CPHL for cash
November 12, 1926: Lost Free Agent Howard Lockhart to the Hamilton Tigers of the CPHL
November 15, 1926: Acquired Jesse Spring from the New York Americans for Laurie Scott
November 17, 1926: Lost Free Agent Gerry Munro to the Detroit Greyhounds of the AHA
January 7, 1927: Acquired Haldor Halderson from the Victoria Cougars (PCHL) for Pete Bellefeuille
February 1, 1927: Transaction from September 27, 1926, voided; Corbett Denneny, Leo Bourgeault and Laurie Scott returned to Saskatoon Sheiks (PrHL), cash returned to Toronto
February 1, 1927: Acquired George Patterson from Hamilton Tigers of the CPHL for loan of Albert Pudas and $5,000
March 7, 1927: Signed Free Agent Lloyd Gross
March 17, 1927: Signed Free Agent Beattie Ramsay

See also
1926–27 NHL season

References

Toronto St. Patricks seasons
Toronto
Toronto